Middle Fork River may refer to:

Middle Fork River
Middle Fork Cimarron River
Middle Fork Eel River
Middle Fork Elk River
Middle Fork Feather River
Middle Fork Flathead River
Middle Fork John Day River
Middle Fork Kings River
Middle Fork Little Snake River
Middle Fork Salmon River
Middle Fork South Platte River
Middle Fork Vermilion River
Middle Fork Willamette River

See also
North Fork Middle Fork Willamette River